"Salvage" is the ninth episode of the eighth season of the American science fiction television series The X-Files. The episode was written by Jeffrey Bell and directed by Rod Hardy. "Salvage" is a "Monster-of-the-Week" story, unconnected to the series' wider mythology. The episode received a Nielsen rating of 7.1 and was viewed by 11.7 million viewers. Overall, the episode received largely negative reviews from critics.

The series centers on FBI special agents Dana Scully (Gillian Anderson) and her new partner John Doggett (Robert Patrick)—following the alien abduction of her former partner, Fox Mulder (David Duchovny)—who work on cases linked to the paranormal, called X-Files. In this episode, Doggett and Scully encounter a dead man who is still living—only somewhat changed. What they discover is a man made of metal, enacting vengeance on those he believes created him.

"Salvage" was loosely based on Tetsuo: The Iron Man, a 1989 Japanese cyberpunk film by cult-film director Shinya Tsukamoto. Written by Jeffrey Bell before Robert Patrick was cast as agent Doggett, the film coincidentally echoes the plot of the 1991 film Terminator 2: Judgment Day, which Patrick starred in. Indeed, the episode contains an explicit reference to Patrick's role, written in homage. The episode contained several elaborate special effects sequences, most notably in the teaser, wherein a man stops a car with his body.

Plot
In Muncie, Indiana, Nora Pearce and Curtis Delario argue about the death of her husband, Ray. Nora believes Ray died from Gulf War syndrome. After attempting to comfort her, Delario starts to drive home and crashes into a man in the middle of the road. His car is totaled, but the man is unharmed as the car breaks around his body. Curtis, grievously injured, looks up at the man and says, “Ray?” The man’s arm slams through the windshield as Curtis screams.

Agents Scully and Doggett investigate the crash. Scully suggests a man stopped the car but Doggett points out that it would have required a dense block of steel to stop the car. Nora Pearce appears and asks what happened to Curtis Delario. Soon afterwards, Scully finds Delario’s body left in a garbage can nearby; his face has gaping holes in it. Autopsying the remains, Scully concludes that the five holes in the man’s face were made by human fingers and someone reached into Delario’s wrecked vehicle and pulled him out by his face. Doggett finds a fresh fingerprint and Ray Pearce's blood. Doggett pays a visit to Nora Pearce and finds her in the company of Harry Odell, who employed Ray Pearce at his salvage yard. Doggett relates the evidence found at the crime scene that appears to indicate Ray is actually alive, but Nora insists she saw Ray die and neither she nor Odell believe Ray could have been involved in Curtis’s death.

Later, Ray Pearce eats at a halfway house as volunteer, Larina Jackson, tries to engage with him. Ray ignores her efforts to reach out, completely uninterested in conversation. Meanwhile at the salvage yard, Odell is shredding documents when Ray appears. Harry feigns friendliness while surreptitiously pulling a shotgun from his desk drawer. He blasts Ray through a sliding glass door, telling him "this time, you stay dead." Outside, he find Ray’s detached arm rebuilding itself, seemingly with metal. Harry is transfixed by this sight as Ray kills him.

The next morning, Doggett checks out the new murder scene and finds an interesting shredded document with the company name for Chamber Technologies. Doggett goes to the company's offices and meets Dr. Pugovel who tell him about the company's efforts to create "smart metals"—metal alloys designed to rebuild themselves but are still "a metallurgist’s pipe dream." Doggett asks about the employee number on the shredded document and learns that the employee, Dr. Clifton, is no longer with the company.  On the phone with Scully, Doggett mentions the "smart metals" and Scully tells him that Ray Pearce’s medical records show that he did not have Gulf War Syndrome but instead that his whole cellular structure was changing due to exposure to an unknown substance. Meanwhile, Larina sees Ray’s obituary in the paper and the television news story about the murder at the salvage yard and decides to call Ray’s widow.

Scully discusses Ray Pearce with Doggett, wondering how, if Pearce has become a 'metal man' "can he be stopped?" Pearce later arrives at Chamber Technologies and Dr. Pugovel lures him into a containment chamber. Doggett, Scully, and SWAT team members surround the chamber but Ray tears his way out of its back wall. Nora waits for Ray in the halfway house and Ray explains that he didn’t come home because he isn’t himself anymore. When Nora pleads to help Ray, he turns angrily to her and says, "They've got to pay for this. They've all got to pay."

Doggett, searching in the salvage yard, finds a Chamber Technologies drum, inside of which is a metal corpse. When Scully and Doggett confront Pugovel about it, he admits it was Dr. Clifton, the doctor who allegedly disappeared. In truth, the Clifton was poisoned by his own work with alloys and requested that he be put in the barrel in order to not ruin the company or slow the research. Though the barrel was meant to be transferred someplace safe, it was instead sent to the salvage yard. Doggett and Scully conclude that Ray was exposed to the barrel, and thus was transformed into a metal human. At the same time, Doggett notices Nora Pearce at the lab, looking through files for the person responsible and, in talking to her, make her understand an unfortunate series of accidents led to Ray's poisoning and no one was truly to blame for his death. Later, the halfway house is raided by the FBI to find Pearce. Larina finds Ray and he puts one hand over her mouth to muffle her, but he kills her by accident.

After Doggett and Scully interrogate Nora, she arrives home and Ray shows up demanding the name of the person responsible. She tells him that the man responsible is Owen Harris. Conflicted by the violence Ray has been inflicting on largely innocent people, Nora tell the police Ray is looking for Owen Harris. Ray finds Harris, along with his family, and nearly kills him. However, he realizes that Harris was an accountant who accidentally sent the barrel to the salvage yard and, seeing that he was ultimately innocent, Ray spares him and goes off to die. Scully believes that this act represented the last of Ray’s humanity and that whatever drove him to kill also made him spare a man who begged for his life. At the very end of the episode, a car is dropped into a compactor at a salvage yard and crushed. As the camera fades out, Ray's eye is seen, a still living metal man as the car is crushed.

Production

Writing
"Salvage" was written by X-Files staff writer Jeffrey Bell and was "loosely" based on Tetsuo: The Iron Man, a 1989 Japanese cyberpunk film by cult-film director Shinya Tsukamoto. The idea to write an episode about a man whose body is made completely out of "dense metal alloys" was developed by Bell before actor Robert Patrick joined the show. Robert Patrick had previously played the role of a liquid-metal T-1000 android assassin in the 1991 film Terminator 2: Judgment Day. In fact, Patrick had been cast as Agent Doggett by the executives in a hope that his role in the movie would appeal to the 18–34 male demographic, upon which advertising prices are based. Fox had anticipated a 10 percent increase in viewership with the addition of Patrick. Indeed, the episode contains an explicit reference to Patrick's role, written in homage: after hearing Scully's theory, Doggett replies, "What’re you saying? Ray Pearce has become some kind of metal man? 'Cause that only happens in the movies, Agent Scully."

With the filming and airing of "Salvage", Robert Patrick began to feel "comfortable in his new role". He later recalled that "we started seeing our [ratings] numbers. Our numbers were good, and everyone was happy." Several of the characters and locations were named or based after real individuals and places. The three scientists: Chamber, Clifton, and Pugovel, were named after friends of Bell's, who were engineers. Much of the action was based in Muncie, Indiana. Bell picked this location because it was the hometown of his grandparents.

Effects
In the episode, Ray Pearce, the metal man, was required to stop a car by himself. In order to create this effect, Wade Williams, the actor who played the metal man, was filmed against a green screen. To create the illusion of being hit by a car, the lighting was dropped and a gust of wind from fans occurred at the moment of the supposed impact. The scene was shot at different speeds, a matte was cut, and various effects, like shattering glass and smoke, were overlaid onto the cut footage. A separate scene, featuring a car hitting a green post was then filmed. The two separate images were then composited together. Producer Paul Rabwin later described the scene as "effective".

Music
A theme from Grieg's Piano Concerto in A Minor is heard multiple times during the episode.

Reception
"Salvage" first aired on Fox on January 14, 2001. The episode earned a Nielsen household rating of 7.1, meaning that it was seen by 7.1% of the nation's estimated households. The episode was viewed by 7.26 million households, and 11.7 million viewers. It ranked as the 54th most-watched episode for the week ending January 14. Subsequently, it debuted in the United Kingdom on the BBC Two on May 5, 2002.

Critical reception to the episode was largely negative. Television Without Pity writer Jessica Morgan rated the episode an F and criticized the episode's plot and, most notably, its ending. Robert Shearman and Lars Pearson, in their book Wanting to Believe: A Critical Guide to The X-Files, Millennium & The Lone Gunmen, rated the episode one star out of five. The two noted that the episode diluted the characters of Doggett and Scully in a "mechanical plot", writing "'Salvage' would never have made a great episode, but if it had only bothered to give a little more depth to Doggett and Scully, it might still have been an entertaining one." Paula Vitaris from Cinefantastique gave the episode a negative review and awarded it one-and-a-half stars out of four. Vitaris referred to the episode as an "assembly line monster-of-the-week episode" and criticized it for failing to make the audience truly empathetic to Ray Pearce's plight. However, Vitaris did praise the make-up in the episode, noting that "that makeup is [Wade Andrew] William's performance […] he is an astonishing sight." Not all reviews were so negative. Emily VanDerWerff of The A.V. Club awarded the episode a "B−". She applauded the way the guest star was allowed to "take over" the episode, but felt that the de-emphasis on Scully and Doggett rendered their scenes "boring". Ultimately, VanDerWerff noted that the problem with it was that the two halves of the story—Doggett and Scully investigation, and Ray's plight—were largely unconnected.

Notes

Footnotes

Bibliography

External links 

The X-Files (season 8) episodes
2001 American television episodes
Television episodes set in Indiana